Joseph C. Wright (August 19, 1892 – February 24, 1985) was an American art director. He won two Academy Awards and was nominated for ten more in the category Best Art Direction. He worked on 86 films between 1923 and 1969. He was born in Chicago, Illinois and died in Oceanside, California.

Academy Awards
Wright won two Academy Awards for Best Art Direction and was nominated a further ten times:

Wins
 This Above All (1942)
 My Gal Sal (1942)

Nominated
 Down Argentine Way (1940)
 Lillian Russell (1940)
 Blood and Sand (1941)
 The Gang's All Here (1943)
 Come to the Stable (1949)
 On the Riviera (1951)
 Guys and Dolls (1955)
 The Man with the Golden Arm (1955)
 Flower Drum Song (1961)
 Days of Wine and Roses (1962)

References

External links

1892 births
1985 deaths
American art directors
Artists from Chicago
Best Art Direction Academy Award winners
People from Oceanside, California